Ján Ťavoda (born 23 September 1990) is a Slovak professional ice hockey player. He is currently player of HC 19 Humenné .

Career
Ťavoda previously played for HKm Zvolen, HC 07 Detva, MsHK Žilina, HC ’05 Banská Bystrica, HK Poprad and HK Dukla Michalovce. He also played in the Kazakhstan Hockey Championship for Gornyak Rudny.

Career statistics

Regular season and playoffs

References

External links

 

1990 births
Living people
Sportspeople from Zvolen
Slovak ice hockey defencemen
HK Poprad players
HKM Zvolen players
HC 07 Detva players
Gornyak Rudny players
HC '05 Banská Bystrica players
MsHK Žilina players
HK Dukla Michalovce players
HC 21 Prešov players
Expatriate ice hockey players in Kazakhstan
Slovak expatriate ice hockey people
Slovak expatriate sportspeople in Kazakhstan